Filippos Verias (alternate spellings: Philippos, Veria, Veroias; Greek: Φίλιππος Βέροιας) is a Greek professional basketball club that is based in Veria. Filippos was founded in 1962, and its colours are white and red. Its emblem is Philip of Macedonia.

History
Filippos Verias' senior men's basketball team was founded in 1962.  In the 2013–14 season, the club played in the Greek 2nd Division (A2 National), for the first time. In the previous years, the club played mostly in the Greek 3rd Division (B National), and in the Greek C League (C National) (the third and fourth divisions of the Greek basketball league system).

Season by season

Titles and honors
National:
Greek 3rd Division 2nd Group Champions: (2013)
Greek 4th Division 3rd Group Champions: (2012)

Local:
6× T.E. West-Central Macedonia Regional League Champions: (1968, 1970, 1974, 1976, 1977, 1980)
2× E.KA.S.KE.DY.M. Local League Champions: (1981, 1982)
2× E.KA.S.KE.M. Local League Champions: (2001, 2003)

Roster

References

External links
Official website 
Eurobasket.com Team Profile

Basketball teams established in 1962
Basketball teams in Greece
Sport in Veria